Banksia rufa is a species of prostrate shrub that is endemic to the south-west of Western Australia. It has broadly linear, pinnatifid or pinnatipartite leaves with between five and twenty lobes on each side, yellow, orange or brownish flowers in heads of forty or more, and glabrous, egg-shaped follicles.

Description
The stems are short, highly branched and woolly-hairy. There are between five and twenty sharply-pointed, linear or triangular lobes on each side of the leaves.

Taxonomy and naming
This species was first formally described in 1855 Carl Meissner in Hooker's Journal of Botany and Kew Garden Miscellany and was given the name Dryandra ferruginea from an unpublished description by Richard Kippist, the type material having been collected by James Drummond.

The following year, Meisner published a description of Dryandra runcinata in Prodromus Systematis Naturalis Regni Vegetabilis and in 1870, George Bentham maintained D. runcinata, but demoted D. ferruginea to Dryandra proteoides var. ferruginea. This stood until 1996, when Alex George restored the specific rank of D. ferruginea, and declared D. runcinata its synonym.

In the same 1996 paper, George described the subspecies chelomacarpa, ferruginea, flavescens, obliquiloba, pumila and tutanningensis in the journal Nuytsia and in 2005 described a seventh, subspecies magna in a later edition of the same journal.

In 2007, all Dryandra species were transferred to Banksia by Austin Mast and Kevin Thiele. As the name Banksia ferruginea had already been published in reference to the plant now known as Pimelea ferruginea, Mast and Thiele changed the name Dryandra ferruginea to Banksia rufa. The specific epithet (rufa) is from the Latin rufus ("reddish"). George's Dryandra ferruginea subspecies were renamed as follows, the names accepted by the Australian Plant Census:

Banksia rufa subsp. obliquiloba is similar to subsp. magna but has less erect leaves and occurs in the Corrigin area;

Distribution and habitat
This banksia is widespread between Pingelly, the Stirling Range and Forrestania where it grows in shrubland and kwongan and is often locally common.

Conservation status
Banksia rufa and subsp. rufa are listed as "not threatened" by the Western Australian Government Department of Parks and Wildlife but all the other subspecies have a priority rating.

References

 

rufa
Plants described in 1855
Taxa named by Carl Meissner